Cruiser rules is a colloquial phrase referring to the conventions regarding the attacking of a merchant ship by an armed vessel.  Here cruiser is meant in its original meaning of a ship sent on an independent mission such as commerce raiding.  A cruiser in modern naval terminology refers to a type of ship rather than its mission.  Cruiser rules govern when it is permissible to open fire on an unarmed ship and the treatment of the crews of captured vessels.  During both world wars, the question was raised of whether or not submarines were subject to cruiser rules.  Initially, submarines attempted to obey them, but abandoned them as the war progressed.

Outline
The essence of cruiser rules is that an unarmed vessel should not be attacked without warning.  It can be fired on only if it repeatedly fails to stop when ordered to do so or resists being boarded by the attacking ship.  The armed ship may only intend to search for contraband (such as war materials) when stopping a merchantman.  If so, the ship may be allowed on its way, as it must be if it is flying the flag of a non-belligerent, after removal of any contraband.  However, if it is intended to take the captured ship as a prize of war, or to destroy it, then adequate steps must be taken to ensure the safety of the crew.  This would usually mean taking the crew on board and transporting them to a safe port.  It is not usually acceptable to leave the crew in lifeboats.  This can only be done if they can be expected to reach safety by themselves and have sufficient supplies and navigational equipment to do so.

History
The cruiser rules evolved during the 17th century when the issuing of letters of marque to privateers was at its peak.  They were initially an understanding of the honourable way to behave rather than formal international agreements.  A formal agreement between Great Britain and France at the end of the Crimean War was extended internationally at the Paris Declaration Respecting Maritime Law in 1856.  It was signed by all maritime nations except the United States and Spain.

A new international agreement was reached in 1909, the London Declaration concerning the Laws of Naval War.  The participants in this treaty were the main European powers, the United States, and the Empire of Japan.  Article 50 of this treaty was what was meant by cruiser rules during World War I.  Initially, the treaty was respected.  The first British merchant ship to be sunk by a German submarine was the SS Glitra in October 1914.  The submarine, SM U-17, allowed the Glitra's crew to board lifeboats first and then towed them to shore after sinking the ship.  Abiding by the cruiser rules in this way was particularly problematic for submarines.  They did not have the room to take captured crew on board and towing lifeboats prevented the submarine from diving.  This put the submarine at considerable risk.

German submarines were further endangered by the British anti-submarine Q-ships.  These looked like merchant ships, but were heavily armed with hidden weapons.  The idea was to tempt a submarine to surface and confront the Q-ship, then reveal the guns and open fire.  In German eyes, this meant that all British ships were potentially a danger and they started to move away from the cruiser rules.  At the beginning of 1915 Germany declared a war zone around the British Isles in retaliation for the British blockade of Germany.  Henceforth, all neutral shipping within the declared zone was liable to attack without warning.  This led to a series of notorious attacks on passenger ships with the loss of civilian lives, some of them American.  These included RMS Lusitania in May 1915, SS Arabic in August 1915, and SS Sussex in March 1916.  Fearing that American deaths would lead to the US entering the war, after each of these incidents Germany made a new pledge not to sink merchant ships until they had witnessed that life boats had been launched.  These pledges were never honoured for long, if at all, and finally Germany announced unrestricted submarine warfare in February 1917.  Germany believed that this strategy would win the war for them, but in reality it contributed to their defeat by causing, in part, the US to enter the war on the side of the Allies.

Despite the experience of World War I, Britain initially expected that German submarines would fight under the cruiser rules in World War II.  However, in September 1939 German submarine U-30 sunk the British passenger liner SS Athenia, apparently mistaking it for a military ship.  Admiral Dönitz pressed for unrestricted submarine warfare on a similar basis to World War I.  Dönitz was starved of resources until after the Battle of Britain in 1940 when it became clear that Britain could not be successfully invaded.  After this, submarine attacks on British merchant shipping commenced in force in the Battle of the Atlantic.  These attacks were without warning and no attempt was made to save crews.

References

Bibliography
 Barclay, Thomas, "Declaration of Paris", in Chisholm, Hugh, Encyclopædia Britannica (11th ed.), vol. 7, Cambridge University Press, 1911.
 Booth, Tony, Admiralty Salvage in Peace and War 1906 - 2006, Pen and Sword, 2007, .
 Gillespie, Alexander, A History of the Laws of War: Volume 1, Hart Publishing, 2011 .
 Griess, Thomas E (ed), The Second World War: Europe and the Mediterranean, Square One Publishers, 2002 .
 Lambert, Andrew, "The only British advantage: sea power and strategy, September 1939-June 1940", in Clemmesen, Michael H; Faulkner, Marcus S (eds), Northern European Overture to War, 1939-1941: From Memel to Barbarossa, pp. 45-74, Brill, 2013 .
 Nolan, Liam; Nolan, John E, Secret Victory: Ireland and the War at Sea, 1914-1918, Mercier Press, 2009 .
 Schmidt, Donald E, The Folly of War: American Foreign Policy, 1898-2005, Algora Publishing, 2005 .

Law of the sea
Prize warfare